A proprietary colony was a type of English colony mostly in North America and in the Caribbean in the 17th century. In the British Empire, all land belonged to the monarch, and it was his/her prerogative to divide. Therefore, all colonial properties were partitioned by royal charter into one of four types: proprietary, royal, joint stock, or covenant. Under the proprietary system, individuals or companies were granted commercial charters by the monarchs of the Kingdom of England to establish colonies. These proprietors then selected the governors and other officials in the colony. 

This type of indirect rule eventually fell out of favor as the colonies became established and administrative difficulties eased. The English sovereigns sought to concentrate their power and authority and the colonies were converted to Crown colonies, i.e. governed by officials appointed by the King, replacing the people the King had previously appointed and under different terms.

Practice 
Proprietary colonies in America were governed by a lord proprietor, who, holding authority by virtue of a royal charter, usually exercised that authority almost as an independent sovereign. These colonies were distinct from Crown colonies in that they were commercial enterprises established under authority of the crown. Proprietary governors had legal responsibilities over the colony as well as responsibilities to shareholders to ensure the security of their investments. 

 Many never even visited the colonies they owned. By the early 18th century, nearly all of the proprietary colonies had either or else had significant limitations placed on them by the crown.

Examples

The Caribbean
Barbados

British America colonies before the American Revolution

The provinces of Maryland, Carolina and several other colonies in the Americas were initially established under the proprietary system. 

King Charles II used the proprietary solution to reward allies and focus his own attention on Britain itself. He offered his friends colonial charters which facilitated private investment and colonial self-government. The charters made the proprietor the effective ruler, albeit one ultimately responsible to English Law and the King. Charles II gave the former Dutch colony New Netherlands to his younger brother The Duke of York, who established the Province of New York.  He gave an area to William Penn who established the Province of Pennsylvania.

The British America colonies before the American Revolution consisted of 20 colonies on the continent’s mainland. After the conflict, thirteen of those became states of the United States of America.  By the time of the Revolution some had consolidated multiple grants, while others, such as conflicting claims to what became the state of Vermont and the western borders of numerous states, including New York and Virginia, as well as the sovereignty of what became the state of Maine in 1820, remained unresolved well after.

Newfoundland Colony
Province of Nova Scotia
Province of New Brunswick
Colony of St. John’s Island (now Prince Edward Island)
Province of Quebec
Virginia Colony
Province of Georgia
Province of North Carolina
Province of South Carolina
Province of Pennsylvania
Province of Massachusetts Bay
Province of New Hampshire
Colony of Rhode Island and Providence Plantations
Connecticut Colony
Province of Maryland
Province of New York 
Province of New Jersey
Delaware Colony

Similar practices outside of English rule

Historical precedent 
In medieval times, it was customary in Continental Europe for a sovereign to grant almost regal powers of government to the feudal lords of his border districts to prevent foreign invasion. Those districts or manors were often called palatinates or counties palatine because the lord wielded the power of the king in his palace. His power was regal in kind but inferior in degree to that of the king.

That type of arrangement had caused many problems in Norman times for certain English border counties. Those territories were known as counties palatine and lasted at least in part to 1830 for good reason: remoteness, poor communications, governance carried out under difficult circumstances. The monarch and the government retained their usual right to separate head and body, figuratively or literally, at any time. (See also the hereditary title marquess.)

French examples 
In 1603, Henry IV, the King of France, granted Pierre Du Gua de Monts the exclusive right to colonize lands in North America st a latitude between 40° and 60° North. The King also gave Dugua a monopoly in the fur trade for those territories and named him Lieutenant General for Acadia and New France. In return, Dugua promised to bring 60 new colonists each year to what would be called Acadie.  In 1607, the monopoly was revoked, and the colony failed, but in 1608, he sponsored Samuel de Champlain to open a colony at Quebec.

The Îles Glorieuses (Glorioso Islands) were on 2 March 1880 settled and named by the Frenchman Hippolyte Caltaux (b. 1847–d. 1907), who was their proprietor from until 1891. It was only on 23 August 1892 that they were claimed for the French Third Republic, as part of the Indian Ocean colony of French Madagascar. Caltaux again became their proprietor from 1901 to his death. On 26 June 1960, the islands became a regular French possession, administered by the High Commissioner for Réunion. On 3 January 2005, they were transferred to the administrators of the French Southern and Antarctic Lands.

See also
 English colonial empire
 Proprietary governor
 Proprietary House
 Colonial government in the Thirteen Colonies
 Crown colony
 Commonwealth
 Lord proprietor
 Donatário
 Quia Emptores

References

Further reading
 Martinez, Albert J. "The Palatinate Clause of the Maryland Charter, 1632-1776: From Independent Jurisdiction to Independence." American Journal of Legal History (2008): 305–325. in JSTOR
 Mereness, Newton Dennison. Maryland as a proprietary province (1901) online
 Osgood, Herbert L.  “The Proprietary Province as a Form of Colonial Government.” Part I.  American Historical Review  2 (July 1896): 644–64; Part 495.  vol 3 (October 1897): 31–55; Part III.  vol 3 (January 1898): 244–65. part 1 online free at JSTOR, part 3 the standard survey
 Osgood, Herbert Levi. The American Colonies in the Seventeenth Century: The Proprietary Province in Its Earliest Form, the Corporate Colonies of New England (1930)
 Osgood, Herbert Levi. The Proprietary Province in Its Later Forms (Columbia University Press, 1930)
 Roper, Louis H., and Bertrand Van Ruymbeke, eds. Constructing Early Modern Empires: Proprietary Ventures in the Atlantic World, 1500-1750 (Brill, 2007)

Constitutional state types
English colonization of the Americas
Colonial government in America
Colonial land law
History of colonialism
Governance of the British Empire